Paul Pearl is an American ice hockey coach and former player. He was previously the associate head coach for Boston University, having also served as head coach for Holy Cross for 19 seasons.

Career
Pearl began attending Holy Cross in 1985 and played for the Division II program for four years, becoming captain of the team in his senior season. Pearl was also a four year letter winner of the Division I baseball team and captained the team his senior year.  After graduating Pearl became director of the ice hockey program at Portsmouth Abbey School for two years before returning to college as an assistant at Connecticut under Bruce Marshall. In 1994 he was named as head coach for his alma mater. He became just the fifth head hockey coach for the Crusaders and would go on to lead his teams to 9 of the 11 most successful seasons in their history.

Holy Cross became a founding member of the MAAC ice hockey conference in 1998 and Pearl helped the team celebrate by winning a then-team record 22 wins capped off by capturing the inaugural conference tournament. Unfortunately the MAAC did not possess an automatic bid for the NCAA tournament and Holy Cross was not invited despite its achievement.  As they had done before Holy Cross won the premier conference tournament for the successor Atlantic Hockey conference but this time were invited to the 2004 tournament. While Pearl's team was blanked by North Dakota their second berth two years later provided what is widely considered the biggest upset in college hockey history when the 15th seed Crusaders downed the second ranked Minnesota Golden Gophers 4-3 in overtime.

In addition to hockey, Pearl was also the head coach of the Holy Cross Crusaders baseball team from 1999 to 2001. He coached the first two teams to ever make the post season tournament and was twice named Patriot League coach of the year.

In 2014 Pearl resigned as head coach and took a position as the associate head coach with Harvard. In 2021, Pearl was named the Head Coach at Cushing Academy, a preparatory school in Ashburnham, Massachusetts.

Head coaching record

References

External links
 

Year of birth missing (living people)
Living people
American ice hockey coaches
Holy Cross Crusaders baseball coaches
Holy Cross Crusaders baseball players
Holy Cross Crusaders men's ice hockey coaches
Holy Cross Crusaders men's ice hockey players
People from Winthrop, Massachusetts
Ice hockey coaches from Massachusetts
American men's ice hockey defensemen
Portsmouth Abbey School alumni
Ice hockey players from Massachusetts